This is a list of the most populous urban areas in Scotland(based on the 2011 census definitions, as defined by the Office for National Statistics (ONS). Using data from the official 2020 estimate.

Definition 

The methodology used by ONS in 2011 is set out in 2011 Built-up Areas – Methodology and Guidance, published in June 2013. When ONS reported the results of the 2011 UK census, it used the term "built-up area" rather than the term "urban area" as used in previous censuses. ONS states, however, that the criteria used to define "built-up area" have not changed:

In reporting the 2001 census, ONS gave a clearer definition of the term "built-up" as follows:

List of most populous urban areas 

The list below shows the most populated urban areas in Scotland as defined by the Office for National Statistics (ONS), as accessible on citypopulation.de. 

{| class="wikitable sortable"
|+ List of Largest Urban Areas in Scotland
|-
! # !! Area !! Population (2020) !! Area  (km2) !! Density (People/km2) !! Primary Subdivisions 
|-
| 1      || Greater Glasgow      || 1,009,300  || 265 || 3,813 || Glasgow, Paisley, Clydebank, Rutherglen, Newton Mearns, Bearsden, Cambuslang, Clarkston, Bishopbriggs
|-
| 2      || Edinburgh      || 530,920|| 125 || 4,241 || Edinburgh, Musselburgh, Wallyford
|-
|3 || Aberdeen || 212,300 || 69.5 || 3,055 || Aberdeen 
|-
|4 || Dundee ||  158,600 || 49.9 ||  3,177 || Dundee, Monifieth, Invergowrie
|-
|5 || Motherwell || 125,190 || 45.1 || 2,773 || Motherwell, Wishaw, Bellshill, Viewpark, Newmains, Holytown
|-
|6 || Falkirk || 102,290 || 43.5 || 2,350 || Falkirk, Grangemouth
|-
|7 || Coatbridge ||89,550  || 23.8 || 3,756|| Coatbridge, Airdrie
|-
|8 ||  Hamilton || 84,210|| 27.6||3,054||  Hamilton, Blantyre
|-
|9 || Dunfermline ||  75,420 || 27.9 || 2,701 || Dunfermline, Rosyth, Inverkeithing
|-
|10 || East Kilbride || 75,110 || 24.2 ||  3,099 ||  East Kilbride
|-
|11 || Greenock || 65,670 || 20.8 || 3,160 || Greenock, Gourock
|-
|12 || Livingston || 65,570 ||  30.4 || 2,158 || Livingston, East Calder, Polbeth
|-
|13 || Inverness || 62,790 || 28.0 || 2,245 || Inverness
|-
|14 || Ayr || 62,000 || 26.6 || 2,334 || Ayr, Prestwick, Alloway, Monkton
|-
|15 || Dalkeith || 54,330 || 16.7 || 3,261 || Dalkeith, Bonnyrigg, Gorebridge, Easthouses
|-
|16 || Kilmarnock || 50,890 ||  16.5 || 3,088 || Kilmarnock
|-
|17 || Kirkcaldy ||  50,180|| 18.9 || 2,661 || Kirkcaldy, Dysart
|-
|18 || Cumbernauld || 49,800 || 21.5 || 2,314 || Cumbernauld

Geography of Scotland
Lists of urban areas
Scotland geography-related lists
United Kingdom lists by population
Urban areas of the United Kingdom